Turraeanthus is a genus of plants in the family Meliaceae. They are dioecious trees or treelets, with pinnate leaves. It contains the following species:
Turraeanthus africana (Welw. ex C.DC.) Pellegr.
Turraeanthus longipes Baill.
Turraeanthus mannii Baill.

References

 
Meliaceae
Meliaceae genera
Taxonomy articles created by Polbot
Taxa named by Henri Ernest Baillon
Dioecious plants